Ooh… diese Ferien is a 1958 Austrian film directed by Franz Antel.

The plot was set in Italy. The script was originally written in German and the music was composed by Johannes Fehring. The film is 104 minutes long and was shot in color.

Plot

Cast 
Heidi Brühl as Monika Petermann
Georg Thomalla as Max Petermann
Hannelore Bollmann as Brigitte "Biggi" Petermann
Mara Lane as Baby die "Baronin"
Michael Cramer as Willi Boltz
C.W. Fernbach as Direktor Antonowitsch
Rolf Olsen as Otto Muffler
Elke Aberle as Stupsi Petermann
Ossi Wanka as Andi Petermann
Hans Moser as Großvater Seidelbast

References

External links 

1958 films
1958 comedy films
Austrian crime comedy films
1950s German-language films
1950s crime comedy films
Films set in Italy
Films set in Spain
Films about vacationing
1950s comedy road movies